Countrified may refer to:

 Countrified (Emerson Drive album)
 Countrified (Farmer Boys album)
 Countrified (John Anderson album)